Luis Mendoza Benedetto (born 21 June 1945) is a Venezuelan footballer. He played in 15 matches for the Venezuela national football team from 1967 to 1979. He was also part of Venezuela's squad for the 1967 South American Championship.

References

External links
 

1945 births
Living people
Venezuelan footballers
Venezuela international footballers
Place of birth missing (living people)
Association footballers not categorized by position
Mineros de Guayana managers